Anne Sofie Filtenborg (born 30 December 1998) is a Danish handball player for HH Elite and the Danish junior national team.

She also represented Denmark in the 2015 European Women's U-17 Handball Championship in Macedonia, leading to the trophy.

Achievements 
Youth World Championship:
Silver Medalist: 2016
European Youth Championship:
Winner: 2015
Junior European Championship:
Silver Medalist: 2017

References

1998 births
Living people
Danish female handball players
People from Randers
Sportspeople from the Central Denmark Region